West Torrens Birkalla Soccer Club, commonly known as Birkalla, is an Australian semi-professional soccer club from Adelaide, South Australia. The club is based in Novar Gardens, a western suburb of Adelaide. The club competes in the National Premier Leagues South Australia, the highest level of football in South Australia and second nationally. Founded in 1923, they are the oldest club in the league.

History 
The West Torrens club was founded in 1923 and Birkalla Rovers was founded by J Taylor in 1933. In 1979 the two clubs merged to form West Torrens Birkalla (nicknamed Birks), the name they played under until the end of the 2001 season. In 2002 the club's name was changed to Adelaide Galaxy.

At the beginning of the 2006 season, Galaxy reverted to its original team colours, yellow and black. They were one of the original sides in the FFSA Super League.

At the beginning for the 2012 season, Galaxy changed their name back to West Torrens Birkalla, and were coached that season by Sergio Melta.

Birkalla has produced four Australian internationals and 19 State representatives.

Current squad

Honours
State League: Champions 2002, 2005
Federation Cup: Winners 2002
State League 1: Premiers 2021

Notable players

  Richie Alagich
  Zenon Caravella
  Ryan Kitto
  Kostas Salapasidis
  Alex Tobin
  James Troisi
  Aaron Westervelt
  Joe Gauci
  Louis D'Arrigo

External links 
Official club website

National Premier Leagues clubs
Soccer clubs in South Australia
Association football clubs established in 1923
1923 establishments in Australia